Michael Nardelli is an American actor and producer.

Early life
Nardelli is one of four children of Susan L. "Sue" (née Schmulbach) and businessman Bob Nardelli. He received his Bachelor of Arts degree in film and theater from the University of Southern California, and was a member of the improv troupe Groundlings.

Career
Nardelli made his acting debut in an episode of Quintuplets in 2004 as "Stradivarius Helberg". He then co-starred in Derby Stallion opposite Zac Efron and later played "Daniel" in a 2009 episode of My Name Is Earl.

Nardelli began Taggart Productions and made his producing debut in 2010 with Another Happy Day. The film was directed by Sam Levinson (director Barry Levinson's son) and stars Kate Bosworth, Demi Moore, Thomas Haden Church, Ellen Burstyn, Ellen Barkin and George Kennedy. Nardelli also portrayed Kate Bosworth's brother in the film. The film received critical acclaim at the 2011 Sundance Film Festival according to The Hollywood Reporter and won the Waldo Salt Screenwriting Award for Best Screenplay for Levinson.

Nardelli also produced the 2012 romantic comedy The Giant Mechanical Man, starring Jenna Fischer, Topher Grace, Chris Messina and Malin Åkerman. and co-starred in the political comedy / true story Grassroots, starring Jason Biggs, Christopher McDonald, Tom Arnold and Cedric the Entertainer which was directed by Stephen Gyllenhaal.

In 2015, Nardelli produced the ensemble science fiction film Circle, also appearing in the film as Eric.

Filmography

Television

References

External links
 

21st-century American male actors
Living people
USC School of Cinematic Arts alumni
American film producers
Year of birth missing (living people)
American male television actors
American male film actors